Krause Publications is an American publisher of hobby magazines and books. Originally a company founded and based in Iola, Wisconsin, they relocated to Stevens Point, Wisconsin, in April 2018.

The company was started by Chester L. Krause (19232016) upon the publication in October 1952 of the first issue of Numismatic News. In the coin collecting community the company is best known for its Standard Catalog of World Coins, a series of coin catalogs commonly referred to as Krause-Mishler catalogs or simply Krause catalogs; they provide information, pricing, and Krause-Mishler (KM) numbers referring to coin rarity and value. Krause-Mishler (named for Krause and longtime employee Clifford Mishler) numbers are the most common way of assigning values to coins. The first edition was published in 1972. In addition, they established the Coin of the Year Award, first issued in 1984, for excellence in coinage design.

In the paper money collecting community, the company is known for its paper money catalogs. In 1975, the first edition of the seminal Standard Catalog of World Paper Money authored by Albert Pick was published. Its numbering system, the Pick numbers, is widely used to identify banknotes.

In 1997, Krause acquired the non-automotive book titles of the Chilton Company. In June 2002 Krause was acquired by F+W (back then F&W Publications). At that time, Krause Publications was publishing 46 periodicals and had nearly 750 books in print. Krause Publications was continued by F+W as an imprint.

In June 2019 the assets of F+W were sold at bankruptcy auctions. The book publishing assets and Krause brand were acquired by Penguin Random House. The magazines were dispersed; Numismatic News, for instance, was acquired by Active Interest Media. The 2019 edition of the Standard Catalog of World Coins was released for XX and XXI century editions. Penguin published the 2020 edition of the XX Century Standard Catalog of World Coins. However, the XXI century edition was not published.

See also

 Blade - a magazine aimed at knife collectors
 Comics Buyer's Guide
 Goldmine - a magazine aimed at record collectors
 Sports Collectors Digest

References

External links

 
 Numismaster - Krause-Mishler's online coin information and homepage

Numismatics
Publishing companies of the United States
Companies based in Wisconsin
Publishing companies established in 1952
1952 establishments in Wisconsin